Part Fourteen (Part XIV) of the Constitution of Albania is the fourteenth of eighteen parts. Titled The State Supreme Audit, it consists of 4 articles sanctioning the function and duties of the State Supreme Audit.

Public Finances

References

14